Radoslav Stojanović, PhD (Радослав Стојановић) (1930, Obrenovac, Kingdom of Yugoslavia – 31 August 2011) was a Professor of Law at the University of Belgrade and was a member of the Founding Committee of the Democratic Party in December 1989. The Democratic Party was the first non-communist opposition party in Serbia.

Since 2001 Stojanović was the Chief Legal Representative of Serbia before the International Court of Justice in the lawsuit brought by Bosnia and Herzegovina against Serbia relating to the 1992–95 Bosnian War. 

His daughter, Dubravka Stojanović, is a professor of history at University of Belgrade.

External links
 The Founding Committee of the Democratic Party 

1930 births
2011 deaths
Date of birth missing
University of Belgrade Faculty of Law alumni
Academic staff of the University of Belgrade
Democratic Party (Serbia) politicians
Place of death missing